Uhuru A. "Joby" Hamiter (born March 14, 1973) is a former American football defensive end who played three seasons in the National Football League with the New Orleans Saints and Philadelphia Eagles. He played college football at Delaware State University and attended Jules E. Mastbaum Area Vocational Technical School in Philadelphia, Pennsylvania. Hamiter was also a member of the New Jersey Rage, England Monarchs, Chicago Bears and Houston Texans.

Early years
Hamiter played high school football as a wide receiver for the Jules E. Mastbaum Area Vocational Technical School Panthers. He teamed with Marc Baxter and Barry Williams to lead Mastbaum to its first Public League Championship in football. He also excelled in basketball for the Panthers.

College career
Hamiter played three seasons for the Delaware State Hornets. He left college to work and was a security officer at the Ferris Juvenile Detention Center in New Castle, Delaware.

Professional career

New Jersey Rage
Hamiter played semi-pro football for the New Jersey Rage.

England Monarchs
Hamiter played for the England Monarchs of NFL Europe during the 1998 season. He played in ten games, recording seven sacks which ranked him fourth in the league.

Philadelphia Eagles
Hamiter was signed by the Philadelphia Eagles on June 19, 1998. He was released by the Eagles on August 30, 1998.

New Orleans Saints
Hamiter was a member of the New Orleans Saints from 1998 to 1999. He played in five games for the Saints during the 1999 season.

Philadelphia Eagles
Hamiter played in seven games for the Philadelphia Eagles in 2000. He was released by the team on August 24, 2001.

Chicago Bears
Hamiter signed with the Chicago Bears on August 27, 2001 and released by the team on September 1, 2001.

Philadelphia Eagles
Hamiter was once again signed by the Philadelphia Eagles on December 31, 2001. He played in one game for the Eagles during the 2001 season.

Houston Texans
Hamiter signed with the Houston Texans on May 30, 2002. He was released by the Texans on August 25, 2002.

References

External links
Just Sports Stats

Living people
1973 births
Players of American football from South Carolina
American football defensive ends
African-American players of American football
Delaware State Hornets football players
London Monarchs players
New Orleans Saints players
Philadelphia Eagles players
People from Kingstree, South Carolina
Players of American football from Philadelphia
21st-century African-American sportspeople
20th-century African-American sportspeople